Spring River may refer to:

 Spring River (Arkansas), in Missouri and Arkansas, U.S.
 Spring River (Maine), U.S.
 Spring River (Missouri), in Missouri, Kansas and Oklahoma, U.S.
 Șpring (river), Romania
 Spring (Milz), a river of Thuringia, Germany

See also
Spring Creek (disambiguation)